Elections to Ballymoney Borough Council were held on 20 May 1981 on the same day as the other Northern Irish local government elections. The election used three district electoral areas to elect a total of 16 councillors.

Election results

Note: "Votes" are the first preference votes.

Districts summary

|- class="unsortable" align="centre"
!rowspan=2 align="left"|Ward
! % 
!Cllrs
! % 
!Cllrs
! %
!Cllrs
! %
!Cllrs
! %
!Cllrs
!rowspan=2|TotalCllrs
|- class="unsortable" align="center"
!colspan=2 bgcolor="" | DUP
!colspan=2 bgcolor="" | UUP
!colspan=2 bgcolor="" | SDLP
!colspan=2 bgcolor="" | Alliance
!colspan=2 bgcolor="white"| Others
|-
|align="left"|Area A
|bgcolor="#D46A4C"|53.8
|bgcolor="#D46A4C"|2
|27.2
|1
|0.0
|0
|19.0
|1
|0.0
|0
|4
|-
|align="left"|Area B
|bgcolor="#D46A4C"|31.6
|bgcolor="#D46A4C"|3
|30.3
|2
|21.3
|2
|0.0
|0
|16.8
|1
|8
|-
|align="left"|Area C
|bgcolor="#D46A4C"|42.3
|bgcolor="#D46A4C"|2
|10.8
|0
|11.6
|0
|0.0
|0
|35.3
|2
|4
|-
|- class="unsortable" class="sortbottom" style="background:#C9C9C9"
|align="left"| Total
|40.3
|7
|24.0
|3
|9.9
|2
|8.1
|1
|17.7
|3
|16
|-
|}

Districts results

Area A

1977: 2 x DUP, 2 x UUP
1981: 2 x DUP, 1 x UUP, 1 x Alliance
1977-1981 Change: Alliance gain from UUP

Area B

1977: 3 x UUP, 3 x SDLP, 1 x DUP, 1 x Independent
1981: 3 x DUP, 2 x UUP, 2 x SDLP, 1 x Independent
1977-1981 Change: DUP (two seats) gain from UUP and SDLP

Area C

1977: 2 x Independent, 1 x Alliance, 1 x Independent Unionist
1981: 2 x DUP, 2 x Independent
1977-1981 Change: DUP (two seats) gain from Alliance and Independent Unionist

References

Ballymoney Borough Council elections
Ballymoney